Victor Sylvester Greene (born 24 September 1960) is a former Barbadian first class cricketer. A right-arm medium-fast bowler, Greene had a short career but played three seasons in England with Gloucestershire.

References

1960 births
Living people
Barbados cricketers
Barbadian cricketers
Gloucestershire cricketers